Vodice nad Kamnikom is a small settlement above Godič in the Municipality of Kamnik in the Upper Carniola region of Slovenia.

Geography

Vodice nad Kamnikom lies on a high level area on the northwest slope of Vovar Hill. The lower end of the village is swampy, and in the higher parts the soil is loamy and stony with good sun exposure. Oševek Creek (a.k.a. Uševk), a tributary of the Nevljica River, starts at a spring south of the village center. The entrance to a natural cave that extends under Brezje nad Kamnikom lies along the road to Vodice nad Kamnikom.

Name
The name of the settlement was changed from Vodice to Vodice nad Kamnikom (literally, 'Vodice above Kamnik') in 1953.

References

External links

Vodice nad Kamnikom on Geopedia

Populated places in the Municipality of Kamnik